is a passenger railway station located in the city of Tokorozawa, Saitama, Japan, operated by the private railway operator Seibu Railway.

Lines
Some through services operate to and from  via the Seibu Ikebukuro Line.

Station layout
The station consists of a ground-level island platform serving two tracks, connected to the station building by a footbridge.

Platforms

History
The station opened on 1 May 1929. It closed on 10 October 1954, but reopened on 4 June 1976.

Station numbering was introduced on all Seibu Railway lines during fiscal 2012, with Shimo-Yamaguchi Station becoming "SI40".

Passenger statistics
In fiscal 2019, the station was the 72nd busiest on the Seibu network with an average of 8,012 passengers daily.  The passenger figures for previous years are as shown below.

The passenger figures for the station in previous years are as shown below.

Surrounding area
 Tokorozawa Yamaguchi Junior High School

References

External links

 Shimo-Yamaguchi Station information (Seibu) 
 Shimo-Yamaguchi Station information (Saitama Prefectural Government) 

Railway stations in Saitama Prefecture
Railway stations in Japan opened in 1929
Railway stations in Tokorozawa, Saitama
Seibu Sayama Line